PD 5500 "Specification for unfired, fusion welded pressure vessels" is a code of practice that provides rules for the design, fabrication, and inspection of pressure vessels.

PD 5500 was formerly a widely used British Standard known as BS 5500, but was withdrawn from the list of British Standards because it was not harmonized with the European Pressure Equipment Directive (97/23/EC). In the United Kingdom it was replaced by EN 13445. It is currently published as a "Published Document" (PD) by the British Standards Institution.

See also 
 Pressure Equipment Directive

References

Pressure vessels
British Standards
Structural engineering standards